Peperomia venabulifolia is a species of perennial or herb from the genus Peperomia. It was discovered by William Trelease in 1940.

Distribution
Peperomia venabulifolia is native to Costa Rica and Panama. Specimens can be found around 12.5-1200 meters.

Costa Rica
Limón
Bratsi
Guanacaste
Tronadora
Alajuela
Angeles
San José
Panama
Chiriquí
Bocas del Toro
Veraguas

Description
It is a moderate-sized erect glabrous herb that grows on trees. Leaves alternate, it has narrow leaves attached to the pointed end while the other end is rounded, long-pointed, wedge-shaped, and attached to the base. They are up to 16 centimeters.

Subtaxa
These subtaxa are accepted.

Peperomia venabulifolia var. amplectens

References

venabulifolia
Flora of Central America
Flora of North America
Flora of Panama
Flora of Costa Rica
Plants described in 1940
Taxa named by William Trelease